Vingtaine de la Ville-à-l'Évêque is one of the five vingtaines of Trinity in the Channel Island of Jersey.

Places in the vingtaine
 Les Platons

References

Vingtaines of Jersey
Trinity, Jersey